The 26th North Carolina Infantry Regiment was an infantry regiment of the Confederate States Army during the American Civil War. The regiment was composed of ten companies that came from various counties across North Carolina and Virginia. It is famous for being the regiment with the largest number of casualties on either side during the war.

Organization and muster
The state of North Carolina seceded from the Union on May 20, 1861, and subsequently joined the Confederate States of America. After seceding, then North Carolina Adjutant General John Hoke called for 30,000 troops to be recruited to support the Confederacy in the war. Congressman Zebulon Baird Vance initially supported the Union but after hearing of the attacks on Fort Sumter, he then advocated for the Confederacy. In local towns people then tried to form companies who would then enter into state service. To encourage enlistment, the state offered a $10 bounty for any man who enlisted into a company. The soldiers in each of the ten companies that made up the 26th North Carolina came primarily from one county, while a few usually came from neighboring counties.

The first company to form as a part of the 26th North Carolina was from Moore County in May 1861. Nine more companies followed suit with soldiers coming from the following counties in North Carolina: Ashe, Union, Wilkes, Wake, Chatham, Caldwell, and Anson. One company also contained soldiers from Grayson County in Virginia. Each of the ten companies had their own nickname that they chose.

History
The regiment was raised in 1861 from central and western North Carolina, with Zebulon B. Vance as its first colonel. Vance was elected Governor of North Carolina in 1862 and command of the unit passed to 20-year-old Col. Henry King Burgwyn, Jr. The 26th spent the next year defending the North Carolina coast, seeing its first action at New Bern, North Carolina. It then went north and fought in the Seven Days Battles before returning to the North Carolina coast.

In 1863, it marched northwards and became attached to General Robert E. Lee's Army of Northern Virginia where they were given the distinction of being not only the largest, but the best trained regiment present. Gen.Pettigrew's brigade was attached to the 3rd Corps led by A.P. Hill.

From there the 26th North Carolina marched ever northward in Maryland and later into Pennsylvania. On July 1, 1863, the 26th North Carolina became engaged in the Battle of Gettysburg, fighting at McPherson's Ridge. The regiment suffered heavy casualties during a fight with the "Iron Brigade"'s 24th Michigan Volunteer Infantry Regiment (which suffered the second most casualties of any Union regiment at Gettysburg—only the 1st Minnesota suffered more), losing Burgwyn, the lieutenant colonel, and 588 men out of a strength of 800, but forced the 24th into a retreat. Out of 800 men taken into battle, it had 86 men killed and 502 wounded. Another 120-136 soldiers would be lost in the tragic Pickett's Charge on July 3.  A marker stands near where the regiment fought and bled.

The second day of Gettysburg was resting near McPherson's Ridge. Pettrigrew and the surviving officers worked to bring men not severely wounded back into the ranks.  On the last day of the battle, the 26th were chosen to take part in the Pettigrew/Pickett's Charge on Cemetery Ridge, it was second from the left in the brigade's line.  The 26th North Carolina suffered artillery fire and then small arms fire as it advanced.  The regiment lost an additional 120 men, and the regimental flag was captured. The regiment lost more men than any other regiment, Union or Confederate, during the battle, including the entire Company F. There is some controversy over whether the Carolinians penetrated the federal line, but they were among the last troops repelled.

Later in the war, the regiment fought during the Overland Campaign and Siege of Petersburg, and remained in the Army of Northern Virginia until its surrender at Appomattox, Virginia.  Maj, later LTC, John Jones led the regiment at the Battle of Bristoe Station.  LTC John Randolph Lane was promoted to Col while recovering from his Gettysburg wound.  He took charge of the regiment in late 1863.  Lane was wounded again in the Battle of the Wilderness on May 5, 1864.  LTC Jones was mortally wounded a day later.  Lane was wounded twice more during the war and was sent home to recover in the spring of 1865.  Consequently, he was absent from the final campaign of the Army of Northern Virginia.

See also
List of North Carolina Confederate Civil War units

References

Further reading
 Davis, Archie K., Boy colonel of the Confederacy: the life and times of Henry King Burgwyn, Jr., Chapel Hill: University of North Carolina Press, 1985.
 Davis, Archie K. Gallantry Unsurpassed: Proceedings of a Dedication Ceremony for a Monument to the 26th North Carolina Regiment, Gettysburg National Military Park, 5 October 1985. Chapel Hill (P.O. Box 127, Chapel Hill 27514-0127): North Caroliniana Society, 1985.
 Eller, Richard. North Carolina's 26th. Hickory, N.C.: Charter Communications, 1998. Relates the history of the 26th North Carolina Regiment's contributions to the Confederate cause during the American Civil War. The program uses period images, re-enactment, and interviews with Civil War historians to describe the men in the regiment and the battles they fought.
 Emerson, John Hudson. Lieutenant John R. Emerson, Company E, 26th Regiment, N.C.T. Cary, N.C.: The author, 1997.
 Gragg, Rod Covered With Glory - The 26th North Carolina Infantry at the Battle of Gettysburg, New York: HarperCollins 2000.
 Hadden, Robert Lee. 1991. "The Deadly Embrace: The Meeting of the Twenty-Fourth Regiment, Michigan Infantry and the Twenty-Sixth Regiment of North Carolina Troops at McPherson's Woods, Gettysburg, Pennsylvania, July 1, 1863". Gettysburg Magazine. no. 5.
 Hall, Harry H. A Johnny Reb Band from Salem: The Pride of Tarheelia. Raleigh [N.C.]: Office of Archives and History, N.C. Dept. of Cultural Resources, 2006.
 Hess, Earl J. Lee's Tar Heels: The Pettigrew-Kirkland-MacRae Brigade. (Chapel Hill, NC: University of North Carolina Press, 2002. .
 Holt, M. Col. Harry K. Burgwyn of the 26th N.C. Regiment. 1900.
 Lineback, J. A., and Donald McCorkle. Regiment Band of the Twenty-Sixth North Carolina. Winston-Salem, N.C.: Moravian Music Foundation, 1958.
 McGee, David Howell. The Twenty-Sixth Regiment North Carolina Troops, CSA. Thesis (M.A.)--Virginia Polytechnic Institute and State University, 1992, 1992.
 McSween, Murdoch John, and E. B. Munson. Confederate Incognito: The Civil War Reports of "Long Grabs," a.K.a. Murdoch John McSween, 26th and 35th North Carolina Infantry. 2013. "Murdoch John McSween wrote over 80 letters under the pseudonym "Long Grabs" to the Fayetteville Observer (North Carolina), serving as their unofficial war correspondent. For the first two full years of the war, 1862–1863, he was a sometimes drill master at Camp Mangum, in Raleigh, and a wanderer among the regiments in North Carolina and Virginia"--Provided by publisher.
 Nigrelli, Christopher Charles. More Musical Contributions of the Salem, North Carolina Moravian Community in the Civil War: An Investigation of the Musical Activities of the Bands of the 21st, 26th, and 33rd North Carolina Regiments / by Christopher Charles Nigrelli. Thesis (D.M.A.)--University of Illinois at Urbana-Champaign, 2003, 2003.
 Society for the Historical Preservation of the Twenty-Sixth Regiment North Carolina Troops. The Society for the Historical Preservation of the Twenty-Sixth Regiment North Carolina Troops, Inc. North Carolina?: The Society, 1988.
 Underwood, George C History of the Twenty Sixth regiment of the North Carolina Troops in the Great War 1861 - '65 Broadfoot Publishing 1978 (facsimile copy of the Nash Brothers edition).
 Underwood, George C., Walter Clark, and Jeffrey L. Halsey. Regimental History of the 26th North Carolina Infantry: Including a Regimental Roster, Contemporary Photographs, Battle Maps and Summaries. Sparta, N.C.: Star Route Books, 2011. "Text is from Histories of the Several Regiments and Battalions from North Carolina, in the Great War 1861-'65 edited by Walter Clark...originally published by the State of North Carolina in 1901."
 Vansant, Wayne, and Ethan Krash. Covered in Glory: The 26th North Carolina at Gettysburg. Atlanta, Ga: S.A.F.E. Systems of America, 1995.

External links
 26th North Carolina  reenacting group
  Company H, 26th Regiment, N.C. State Troops
 Flags of the First Day: An Online Exhibit of Iron Brigade and Confederate battle flags from July 1, 1863 :  (Civil War Trust)

Units and formations of the Confederate States Army from North Carolina
1861 establishments in North Carolina